Lacey Green is a village and civil parish in Buckinghamshire

Lacey Green may also refer to:

Lacey Green, Cheshire, England
Lacey Green, London, England
Lacey Greene, a character in the comic book series Walking Dead

See also
Laci Green (born 1989), an American YouTuber